Vasyl Stepanovych Yadukha (born 25 January 1964, Verbka-Murovana, Ukraine) is a Ukrainian politician, former member of the Verkhovna Rada (Ukraine's national parliament).

In 1986–2006 with breaks he worked at various kolkhozes and agro firms.

In 2006-2007 Yadukha was a member of the Verkhovna Rada representing Party of Regions. In the 2007 Ukrainian parliamentary election heo failed to get reelected to parliament as a candidate of the same party.

In 2010-2014 he served as a Governor of Khmelnytskyi Oblast.

References

External links
 Profile at the Official Ukraine Today portal

1964 births
Living people
People from Khmelnytskyi Oblast
Podilskyi State Agro-Technical University alumni
Governors of Khmelnytskyi Oblast
Fifth convocation members of the Verkhovna Rada
Party of Regions politicians